The Magnus Carlsen Invitational 2020 was an online chess tournament that ran from 18 April to 3 May 2020 as the first round of the Magnus Carlsen Chess Tour.

In addition to the world chess champion Magnus Carlsen, who organized the tournament, Fabiano Caruana, Ding Liren, Alireza Firouzja, Anish Giri, Hikaru Nakamura, Ian Nepomniachtchi, and Maxime Vachier-Lagrave took part in the event. The tournament received media attention as one of the few sports events during the COVID-19 pandemic.

The tournament was structured as a series of mini-matches, consisting of four games of rapid chess, if needed followed by two rounds of blitz chess (semi-finals and final only), if needed followed by an Armageddon tie-break. The winner after rapid games received 3 points, the loser 0 points; if a tie-break was necessary, the winner received 2 points and the loser 1 point. The eight players played a round robin with the top four advancing to the semi-finals. Carlsen beat Nakamura in the final to win the tournament.

The tournament was broadcast by Chess24.com with Jan Gustafsson, Peter Svidler, Tania Sachdev and Lawrence Trent providing most of the commentary.

Group stage results

Group stage standings

Play-offs

References

External links 
 Magnus Carlsen Invitational, official website
 All games on chess24.com

2020 in chess
2020 in video gaming
Chess competitions
April 2020 sports events
May 2020 sports events
Impact of the COVID-19 pandemic on sports
Magnus Carlsen